Bridge School may refer to:

 Bridge School Benefit, an annual concert held in Mountain View, California, United States
 Bridge School (California), United States
 Bridge School (Colorado), United States
 The Bridge School, Ipswich, in Suffolk, England
 Bridge School (Michigan), former school in Michigan, United States